Twante Thein Tan was a Burmese singer, songwriter, actor, and film director. He starred in the popular Burmese movie Me, and You, and Padauk Blossoms (ကိုယ်ရယ် မင်းရယ် ပန်းပိတောက်ရယ်).

He was known as a singer and songwriter for his songs like "Pan Nwe Ga Sein"(ပန်းနွယ်ကစိမ်း) and "Nham laat shot nay laytot". His songs often describe the natural beauty of the countryside and the rural people.

Early life 
He was born Maung Thein Tan in Twante, Yangon Region, on September 26, 1941. His father was British by the name of U Nyunt and his mother's name was Daw Chit Tin. He was the fifth child in a family of six.

Albums 
Myat Nar Wine
Special Mingalar Couple (2013)
Ko a Hlei
Soe Moe Myittar
Mya Hnin Si
Thaw Nuetra Nei Ma Tu Tei Ngar

Death
He died of liver cancer in Yangon on January 11, 1999.

References

1941 births
1999 deaths